Muthassi may refer to: 

 Muthassi (novel), a 1957 Malayalam-language novel by Cherukad
 Muthassi (film), a 1971 Malayalam-language film